Transphobia is a collection of ideas and phenomena that encompass a range of negative attitudes, feelings, or actions towards transgender people or transness in general. Transphobia can include fear, aversion, hatred, violence or anger towards people who do not conform to social gender expectations. It is often expressed alongside homophobic views and hence is often considered an aspect of homophobia. Transphobia is a type of prejudice and discrimination, similar to racism and sexism, and transgender people of color are often subjected to all three forms of discrimination at once.

Transgender youth may experience sexual harassment, bullying, and violence in school, foster care, and welfare programs, as well as potential abuse from within their family. Adult victims experience public ridicule, harassment including misgendering, taunts, threats of violence, robbery, insisting that they must change their physical bodies to comport with societal perceptions of gender, and false arrest; many feel unsafe in public. A high percentage report being victims of sexual violence. Some are refused healthcare or suffer workplace discrimination, including being fired for being transgender, or feel under siege by conservative political or religious groups who oppose LGBT-rights laws. They also suffer discrimination from some people within LGBT social movements, and from some feminists.

Besides the increased risk of violence and other threats, the stress created by transphobia can cause negative emotional consequences which may lead to substance use disorders, running away from home (in minors), and a higher rate of suicide.

In the Western world, there have been gradual changes towards the establishment of policies of non-discrimination and equal opportunity. The trend is also taking shape in developing nations. In addition, campaigns regarding the LGBT community are being spread around the world to improve social acceptance of nontraditional gender identities. The "Stop the Stigma" campaign by the UN is one such development.

Etymology and use
The word transphobia is a classical compound patterned on the term homophobia. The first component is the neo-classical prefix trans- (originally meaning "across, on the far side, beyond") from transgender, and the second component -phobia comes from the Ancient Greek  ("fear"). Along with lesbophobia, biphobia and homophobia, transphobia is a member of the family of terms used when intolerance and discrimination is directed toward LGBT people.

Transphobia is not a phobia as defined in clinical psychology (i.e., an anxiety disorder). Its meaning and usage parallels xenophobia. The noun transphobe denotes someone who harbors transphobia. The adjectival form transphobic may be used to describe a transphobe or their actions. The words transphobia and transphobic were added to the Oxford English Dictionary in 2013.

Origins
Transfeminist theorist and author Julia Serano argues in her book Whipping Girl that transphobia is rooted in sexism, and locates the origins of both transphobia and homophobia in what she calls "oppositional sexism", the belief that male and female are "rigid, mutually exclusive categories, each possessing a unique and nonoverlapping set of attributes, aptitudes, abilities, and desires". Serano contrasts oppositional sexism with "traditional sexism", the belief that males and masculinity are superior to females and femininity. Furthermore, she writes that transphobia is fueled by insecurities people have about gender and gender norms.

Other transgender rights authors argue that a significant part of the oppositional sexist origin of transphobia, and especially of the forms that incite violence towards transsexual people, is linked to psychological claims of difference between male sexuality and female sexuality in the brain's protection mechanisms from committing sex crimes. These authors argue that the assumption that men's acceptable sexuality is based on category-specific sexual arousal while women's acceptable sexual behavior is said to be due to lower sex drive and especially higher sexual inhibitions causes allegations that transsexual people have neither safety system in the brain and are sex criminals, and recommend information about flaws in studies that claim to show such sex differences (including the possibility that fear of being alleged to be inappropriately sexually aroused may deter more men than women from taking part in sexual arousal studies) as a remedy.

Others have argued that hostility towards transgender identity is in part due to the challenge it poses to a lay belief that gender is based on observable physical and behavioral characteristics that are determined at birth. Rad and colleagues surveyed a sample of 1323 American adults, asking them to identify the gender of transgender persons who medically transitioned. They found that the type of transition procedure mattered but its direction did not. Specifically, biological changes resulted in the target being more identified with their self-identified gender than their birth-assigned gender, but there were no significant differences between male-to-female and female-to-male transitions. Moreover, compared to male test subjects, female test subjects were more likely to identify the targets as their self-identified gender. This pattern is consistent with the notion that transphobia is rooted in the hierarchical social classification system where low-status groups (e.g., females) view the hierarchy in less essentialist ways than high-status groups (e.g., males). This gender difference was larger in younger, more liberal, and less religious non-Midwestern respondents. The authors further showed that gender category beliefs (ratings of the transgender person's post-transition gender identity) were strongly associated with attitudes and feelings of warmth towards transgender people. However, gender category beliefs performed better in predicting bathroom policy preferences compared to feelings in unseen data, further confirming that beliefs about what gender is and how it is determined are significantly linked to transphobia and support for anti-transgender policies.

Transgender author and critic Jody Norton believes that transphobia is an extension of homophobia and misogyny. She argues that transgender people, like gays and lesbians, are hated and feared for challenging and undermining gender norms and the gender binary. Norton writes that the "male-to-female transgender incites transphobia through her implicit challenge to the binary division of gender upon which male cultural and political hegemony depends".

Drawing on theory of radicalization, Craig McLean argues that discourse on transgender-related issues in the UK has been radicalized in response to the activities of what he terms the anti-transgender movement that pushes "a radical agenda to deny the basic rights of trans people (...) under the cover of 'free speech.'"

Related concepts
The related concept of cissexism (also termed cisgenderism, related to but distinct from cisnormativity or cissexual assumption, occasionally used synonymously with transphobia) is the appeal to norms that enforce the gender binary and gender essentialism, resulting in the oppression of gender variant, non-binary, and transgender identities. Cisgenderism refers to the assumption that, due to human sexual differentiation, one's gender is determined solely by a biological sex of male or female (based on the assumption that all people must have either an XX or XY sex-chromosome pair, or, in the case of cisgenderism, a bivalent male or female expression), and that trans people are inferior to cisgender people due to being in "defiance of nature". Cisgender privilege is the "set of unearned advantages that individuals who identify with their biological sex accrue solely due to having a cisgender identity".

Harassment and violence directed against transgender people is often called trans bashing, and can be physical, sexual or verbal. Whereas gay bashing is directed against a target's real or perceived sexual orientation, trans bashing is directed against the target's real or perceived expressed gender identity. The term has also been applied to hate speech directed at transgender people and to depictions of transgender people in the media that reinforce negative stereotypes about them. Notable victims of violent crimes motivated by transphobia include Brandon Teena, Gwen Araujo, Angie Zapata, Nizah Morris, Lauren Harries, Diana Sacayán, Jennifer Laude, Agnés Torres Hernández, Gisberta Salce Júnior, Shelby Tracy Tom, and Nireah Johnson.

Transprejudice is a term similar to transphobia, and refers to the negative valuing, stereotyping, and discriminatory treatment of individuals whose appearance or identity does not conform to current social expectations or conventional conceptions of gender.

Manifestations
Transgender people are often excluded from entitlements or privileges reserved for people of the same gender, but whose sex assigned at birth differs. It is very common, for example, for transgender women to be stopped or questioned when they use public bathrooms designated for women. Homeless shelters, hospitals and prisons have denied trans women admission to women's areas and forced them to sleep and bathe in the presence of men.

Harassment and violence

Transgender individuals are at increased risk for experiencing aggression and violence throughout their life when compared to cisgender (non-transgender) individuals. Even more so when it comes to sexual violence. Aggression and violence against transgender people is perpetrated intentionally through physical violence or bodily harm, sexual violence or assault, and verbal or emotional abuse. Aggression and violence can also include victimization, bullying, harassment, and multiple forms of stigma such as discrimination. Abuse against transgender people can come from many different sources including family, friends, partners, neighbors, co-workers, acquaintances, strangers, and the police. These forms of aggression and violence enacted against transgender people can occur at each developmental stage in life. More so, that one, or multiple kinds of abuse are likely to take place throughout a transgender person's life.

As homophobia and transphobia are correlated, many trans people experience homophobia and heterosexism; this is due to people who associate trans people's gender identity with homosexuality, or because trans people may also have a sexual orientation that is non-heterosexual. Author  stated, "Transgender people subjected to violence, in a range of cultural contexts, frequently report that transphobic violence is expressed in homophobic terms." Attacking someone on the basis of a perception of their gender identity rather than a perception of their sexual orientation is known as "trans bashing", analogous to "gay bashing".

According to the American Psychological Association, transgender children are more likely than other children to experience harassment and violence in school, foster care, residential treatment centers, homeless centers and juvenile justice programs. Researchers say trans youth routinely experience taunting, teasing and bullying at school, and that nearly all trans youth say they were verbally or physically harassed in school, particularly during gym class, at school events, or when using single-sex restrooms. Three-quarters report having felt unsafe.

As adults, transgender people are frequently subjected to ridicule, stares, taunting and threats of violence, even when just walking down the street or walking into a store. A U.S. survey of 402 older, employed, high-income transgender people found that 60% reported violence or harassment because of their gender identity. 56% had been harassed or verbally abused, 30% had been assaulted, 17% had had objects thrown at them, 14% had been robbed and 8% had experienced what they characterized as an unjustified arrest.

A study of 81 transgender people in Philadelphia found 30% reported feeling unsafe in public because they were transgender, with 19% feeling uncomfortable for the same reason. When asked if they had ever been forced to have sex, experienced violence in their home, or been physically abused, the majority answered yes to each question.

Sexual violence
A review of American studies on sexual violence towards transgender people found that it is "shockingly common" and while reported rates vary considerably among studies for methodological and other reasons, the most common finding is that around 50% of transgender people have been sexually assaulted. In 2009, researcher Rebecca L. Stotzer published an article in Aggression and Violent Behavior that compiled information from numerous studies reporting violence against transgender people. In the article Stotzer noted that transgender people have a high risk of experiencing sexual violence throughout their lifetimes.

A meta-analysis on the rates of intimate partner violence found that transgender individuals are 66% more likely to experience violence of some kind from an intimate partner than cisgender subjects, and more than twice as likely to experience both sexual and physical intimate partner violence than their cisgender peers.

Physical violence
Perpetrators of physical violence against transgender people are reported to have been influenced by negative attitudes against transgender people, many of whom do not report their assault to the police.  In the United States, the available homicide data suggests that transgender people are murdered at a lower rate than cisgender people. However, young Black and Latina trans women appear to be at greater risk of homicide than their cisgender peers. When Black and Latina transgender women are murdered, they are often shot, struck or stabbed repeatedly, a phenomenon known as overkill.

Misgendering

Misgendering is the act of labelling others with a gender that does not match their gender identity. Misgendering can be deliberate or accidental; common examples of misgendering a person are using the wrong pronouns to describe someone, calling a person "ma'am" or "sir" in contradiction to the person's gender identity, using a person's previous, pre-transition name for them in place of their current name (a practice called "deadnaming"), or insisting that a person must adhere to the roles or norms assigned to their sex assigned at birth rather than the ones that align with their gender identity; for example, using a bathroom designated for males even though the person identifies as female.

The experience of being misgendered is common for all transgender people before they transition, and for many afterwards as well. Transgender people are regularly misgendered by doctors, police, media and peers, experiences that have been described as "mortifying", cruel, and serving to "only making our lives harder". A 2018 study of 129 transgender and other gender-expansive youth, published in the Journal of Adolescent Health, found that "for each additional social context in which a youth's chosen name was used, there was a statistically significant decrease in depressive symptoms, suicidal ideation, and suicidal behaviors." Deliberately misgendering a transgender person is considered extremely offensive by transgender individuals.

In society

In healthcare

A study of 81 transgender people in Philadelphia found 14% said they had been refused routine medical care because they were transgender. 18% answered 'yes' when asked if, when they went in for a check-up, "being transgender created a problem" for them.

Additionally, a study of 223 healthcare providers indicated a correlation between transphobia and decreased performance on survey questions regarding the treatment of transgender patients, with no significant correlation to the amount of time spent learning about transgender health, leading researchers to state, "Broader efforts to address transphobia in society in general, and in medical education in particular, may be required to improve the quality of medical care for [transgender and gender diverse] patients."

Transgender people depend largely on the medical profession to receive vital care, including hormone replacement therapy. In one case, Robert Eads died of ovarian cancer after being refused treatment by more than two dozen doctors. In the United States–based National Center For Transgender Equality's 2011 survey, 19% had been refused medical care due to their transgender or gender non-conforming status, showing that refusal of treatment due to transphobia is not uncommon. Another example of this is the case of Tyra Hunter. Hunter was involved in an automobile accident, and when rescue workers discovered she was transgender, they backed away and stopped administering treatment. She later died in a hospital.

In many European countries, laws require that any transgender person who wishes to change their legal gender must first be sterilized. Sweden repealed its law in December 2012, and the European Court of Human Rights struck down such laws in 2017.

In the workplace
Transphobia also manifests itself in the workplace. Some transgender people lose their jobs when they begin to transition. A 1995 study from Willamette University stated that a transgender person fired for following the recommended course of treatment rarely wins it back through federal or state statutes.

News stories from the San Francisco Chronicle and Associated Press cite a 1999 study by the San Francisco Department of Public Health finding a 70% unemployment rate amongst the city's transgender population. On 18 February 1999, the San Francisco Department of Public Health issued the results of a 1997 survey of 392 trans women and 123 trans men, which found that 40% of those trans women surveyed had earned money from full or part-time employment over the preceding six months. For trans men, the equivalent statistic was 81%. The survey also found that 46% of trans women and 57% of trans men reported employment discrimination.

A 2002 American study found that among educators, trans educators are 10–20% more likely to experience workplace harassment than their gay and lesbian colleagues.

In the hiring process, discrimination may be either open or covert, with employers finding other ostensible reasons not to hire a candidate or just not informing prospective employees at all as to why they are not being hired. Additionally, when an employer fires or otherwise discriminates against a transgender employee, it may be a "mixed motive" case, with the employer openly citing obvious wrongdoing, job performance issues or the like (such as excessive tardiness, for example) while keeping silent in regards to transphobia.

Employment discrimination on the basis of gender identity and expression is illegal in the United States. Such discrimination is outlawed by specific legislation in the State of New Jersey and might be in other states (as it is in the states of California, Illinois, Maine, Minnesota, New Mexico and Washington) or city ordinances; additionally, it is covered by case law in some other states. (For example, Massachusetts is covered by cases such as Lie vs. Sky Publishing Co. and Jette vs. Honey Farms.) Several other states and cities prohibit such discrimination in public employment. Sweden and the United Kingdom have also legislated against employment discrimination on the grounds of gender identity. Sometimes, however, employers discriminate against transgender employees in spite of such legal protections.

As an example of a high-profile employment-related court case unfavorable to transgender people, in 2000 the southern U.S. grocery chain Winn-Dixie fired long-time employee Peter Oiler, despite a history of repeatedly earning raises and promotions, after management learned that the married, heterosexual truck driver identified as transgender and occasionally cross-dressed off the job. Management argued that this hurt Winn-Dixie's corporate image. The American Civil Liberties Union filed a lawsuit against Winn-Dixie on behalf of Oiler, but a judge dismissed it.

Sometimes transgender people facing employment discrimination turn to sex work to survive, placing them at additional risk of  encountering troubles with the law, including arrest and criminal prosecution; enduring workplace violence; and possibly contracting sexually transmitted diseases such as HIV.

The transgender community faces huge amounts of employment discrimination due to their gender identity, and there are very few laws that protect the employment rights of this community. The limited career options for the transgender community leave them economically vulnerable. A study conducted by Anneliese Singh and Vel McKleroy on transgender people of color revealed that difficulty finding a job or losing a job due to transphobia in workplace resulted in some of the transgender people living in crime-ridden neighborhoods, and getting involved in abusive relationships. Lack of employment has also resulted in the transgender community resorting to illegal means of earning money such as drug-dealing or sex work.

A 2021 study in the Journal of Career Development looks at 18 Latino transgender immigrants to the United States and finds five themes related to these participants' experiences while seeking employment: discrimination, limited options, positive experiences, and disability benefits as financial relief.

From government

Transgender people also face the denial of right of asylum or inhuman treatment in process of asylum-seeking. For example, Fernanda Milan, a transgender woman from Guatemala, was placed in an asylum center for males in Denmark, and while there was raped by several men. She was in danger of deportation into Guatemala, where transgender people have no rights and face possible execution, but has since been granted entry.

Transgender disenfranchisement is the practice of creating or upholding barriers that keep transgender individuals from voting and therefore restrict the principles of universal suffrage. Voter identification laws in the United States often impact transgender individuals' ability to vote, since many lack photo identification with their current name and gender.

Prisons frequently make no attempt to accommodate transgender individuals, assigning them to facilities using only the criteria of genitalia, which is believed to contribute to the pervasiveness of prison rape with regards to transgender women. Prison staff have been noted to frequently deny trans women privileges disproportionately, and The Eighth Amendment right for an individual not to be given cruel or unusual punishment have historically not been liberally enforced in cases involving transgender inmates.

In education
Within the school system, many transgender teens are harassed and mistreated with reported negative effects on both victim and the school's population in general. "Transgender youth frequently report fear and anxiety about using restrooms and locker rooms at school because they had experienced harassment by both peers and adults when using them." Over 80% of transgender teens report feeling unsafe in a school environment, more than 40% report having been physically abused, and over 65% report being bullied online or via social media. Through official channels, such discrimination is generally underreported, and school officials may even participate in transphobic name-calling or victim-blaming. Additionally, administrative practices such as misgendering students in school records can contribute to transgender students' distress in school.

A study done on Canadian high school students between December 2007 and June 2009 illustrated how the LGBTQ students feel unsafe at the school, and are exposed to insults and discrimination by their peers and sometimes even by their teachers. Even heterosexual students and teachers fear attack by transphobia on account of supporting or having a transgender friend or family member.

Online

The phrase "I sexually identify as an attack helicopter" is an Internet meme described as transphobic that originated as a copypasta on the Internet forum Reddit, which spread to other forums such as 4chan, where it was used (peaking in 2015) to mock transgender people.

Transgender people are often victims of online harassment.

In religion

In Christianity

In North America, organizations associated with the Christian right, including the American Family Association, Family Research Council, Focus on the Family, National Association for Research and Therapy of Homosexuality, believe that "transgenderism" is unnatural and that transgender people are and remain their birth sex. These organizations oppose laws and policies intended to accommodate transgender people, such as allowing them to change their legal sex, use the washroom corresponding to the gender with which they identify, or become ordained Christian ministers. It is their position that God created people's bodies as they are meant to be, that accepting transgender people would violate scripture and natural law, and that the Bible refers to male and female only.

According to the Ontario Consultants for Religious Tolerance website, under Pope John Paul II, the Holy See first stated its opposition to reassignment surgery in 2000, although it was not made public until 2003.

Transgender people face particular challenges in attempting to integrate their faith with their gender identity. One author says "expectations [based on gender] are usually predicated upon our genitalia and begin from the moment of birth, continuing throughout our lives." Many Christian denominations use biblical notions of gender and gender roles to support their views. These include "So God created man in His own image, in the image of God He created him; male and female He created them" (Genesis 1:27) and "The woman shall not wear that which pertaineth unto a man, neither shall a man put on a woman's garment: for all that do so are an abomination unto the Lord thy God" (Deuteronomy 22:5).

Views of gender identity based on the Christian faith do not always coincide with the ideologies of transgender individuals. However, if they do not conform to these expectations, they may face rejection. Many transgender Christians seek out an "individualized relationship with God", often facing "a period of denial and struggle" as well as depression, disconnection, dissatisfaction, and spiritual difficulty before "discovering a sense of self that feels integral and true". However, after discovering their gender identity, many transgender individuals still face barriers within the church, such as "fear and unfamiliarity on the part of the congregation, language issues, physical layout that separates people by gender, programs that exclude or separate by gender, pathologizing or designating trans issues as sinful, and overt hostility".

In Islam
The Islamic faith has historically supported heteronormative, binary gender identification. This support is reinforced by the cultural norms of Muslims and their traditional readings of sacred texts which prohibit a wide range of identities. Despite this history, progressive Muslims have built arguments that support transgender Muslims on long-established doctrine, and support for gender transition has even been found among influential conservative scholars.

In 1988, gender reassignment surgery was declared acceptable under Islamic law by scholars at Egypt's Al-Azhar, the world's oldest Islamic university. In Iran during 1987, Ayatollah Khomeini, the supreme religious leader of the Islamic Republic of Iran at that time, also declared transgender surgical operations as acceptable (see transgender rights in Iran). The foundation for this accepting attitude in contrast to intolerance of homosexuality is the belief that a person is born transgender but chooses to be homosexual. Despite this acceptance among some conservative Muslim scholars and leaders, transgender individuals within the Muslim community still face particular challenges.

Today, there are some Muslim communities that explicitly welcome transgender Muslims, including some which have trans leadership. Masjid Al-Rabia, founded in 2017, is a trans-led, women-centred, LGBTQ+ affirming mosque based in Chicago, IL. In Northampton, Massachusetts, the Pioneer Valley Progressive Muslims (Masjid Al-Inshirah) was founded in 2010 by a transgender Muslim.  Muslims for Progressive Values has founded Unity Mosques in Atlanta, Georgia; Columbus, Ohio; and Los Angeles, California; as well as outside the United States. The Muslim Alliance for Sexual and Gender Diversity hosts an annual retreat for LGBTQ+ Muslims in Pennsylvania each May. The Trans and Muslim Project of TransFaith is a project devoted specifically to the support of transgender Muslims.

In feminism

Some positions within feminism have been considered transphobic. This may include criticism of transitioning or sex reassignment surgery (SRS) as a personal choice or medical invention, or the position that trans women are not women in a literal sense and should not be allowed access to women-only spaces. Some second-wave feminists perceive trans men and women respectively as "traitors" and "infiltrators" to womanhood.

Second-wave feminist and activist Gloria Steinem expressed concerns in 1977 about transsexuality and SRS, writing that in many cases, transsexuals "surgically mutilate their own bodies." She concluded that "feminists are right to feel uncomfortable about the need for and uses of transsexualism." For some years, this led to Steinem being characterized as transphobic. In 2013, she repudiated the interpretation of her text as an altogether condemnation of SRS, stating that her position was informed by accounts of gay men choosing to transition as a way of coping with societal homophobia. She added that she sees transgender people as living "authentic lives" that should be "celebrated".

Radical feminist Janice Raymond's 1979 book, The Transsexual Empire, was and is still controversial due to its unequivocal condemnation of transsexual surgeries. In the book Raymond says, "All transsexuals rape women's bodies by reducing the real female form to an artifact, appropriating this body for themselves .... Transsexuals merely cut off the most obvious means of invading women, so that they seem non-invasive" and that trans people should be "morally mandated out of existence".

Another site of conflict between feminists and trans women has been the Michigan Womyn's Music Festival. In the early 1990s, the festival ejected a transsexual woman, Nancy Burkholder. In 2014, the festival "passionately rejected" accusations that it believed transgender "womyn are 'less than' other womyn." The activist group Camp Trans had protested the "womyn-born-womyn" intention and advocated for greater acceptance of trans women within the feminist community. The festival had considered allowing only post-operative trans women to attend; however, this was criticized as classist, as many trans women cannot afford sex reassignment surgery.

Trans women such as Sandy Stone challenged the feminist conception of "biological woman". Stone worked as a sound engineer for Olivia Records from about 1974 to 1978, resigning as the controversy over a trans woman working for a lesbian-identified enterprise increased. The debate continued in Raymond's book, which devoted a chapter to criticism of "the transsexually constructed lesbian-feminist." Groups like Lesbian Organization of Toronto then voted to exclude trans lesbians. Sheila Jeffreys described "transgenderism" as "deeply problematic from a feminist perspective and [stated] that transsexualism should be seen as a violation of human rights."

In 2017, with regard to the question of whether trans women are women, Chimamanda Ngozi Adichie expressed the view that "trans women are trans women", meaning that while she acknowledges them to face discrimination on the basis of being transgender and sees this as a serious issue, she thinks that their experiences should not be conflated with those of women who face oppression on the basis of being born female. After sustaining severe criticism for her views, Adichie opined that the American Left is "creating its own decline" and is "very cannibalistic." She explained that she sees trans women as women despite her views, but stood behind her position. The work of poststructuralist feminist and lesbian Judith Butler, particularly their books Gender Trouble (1990) and Bodies That Matter (1993), argues that the "violent inscription" of gender as a social construct on human bodies leads to violence against those who do not conform to such binaristic gender dichotomies.

Feminists who oppose the inclusion of trans women in women's spaces have been labeled "TERFs", short for "trans-exclusionary radical feminists". Those at whom the term is directed, in turn, have perceived their labeling as "TERF" to be a slur. Feminist journalist Sarah Ditum, who writes for The Guardian and the New Statesman, said that the term is used to silence feminists through guilt by association. Meghan Murphy, founder of Canadian feminist website Feminist Current, opined that "TERF" should be considered hate speech after a woman was physically assaulted and several people defended or celebrated the assault on the grounds that the woman was a "TERF" and as such deserving of violence.

In gay, lesbian, and bisexual communities
Transphobia is documented in the lesbian, gay and bisexual (LGB) communities, despite historic cooperation between these communities in campaigns for equality, such as in the Stonewall Riots.

Authors and observers, such as transgender author Jillian Todd Weiss, have written that "there are social and political forces that have created a split between gay/lesbian communities and bisexual/transgender communities, and these forces have consequences for civil rights and community inclusion. 'Biphobia' and 'transphobia' are a result of these social and political forces, not psychological forces causing irrational fears in aberrant individuals."

Gay and lesbian communities

Historian Joanne Meyerowitz documented transphobia within the gay rights movement in the mid 20th century in response to publicity surrounding the transition of Christine Jorgensen. Jorgensen, who made frequent homophobic remarks and insisted she was not connected to or identified with gay men, was a polarizing figure among activists:

Several prominent figures in second wave feminism have also been accused of transphobic attitudes, culminating in 1979 with the publication of The Transsexual Empire by radical lesbian feminist Janice Raymond, who popularized the term shemale as derogatory slur referring to trans women in 1994, and her statements on transsexuality and transsexual people have been criticized by many in the LGBT and feminist communities as extremely transphobic and as constituting hate speech.

In 1950s America, there was a debate among gay men and women about those who felt they were of the opposite sex. Gay men and women who were trying to melt quietly into the majority society criticized them as "freaks" who brought unwanted disreputable attention upon them. Such attitudes were widespread at the time.

Some trans men face rejection from lesbian communities they had been part of prior to transition. Journalist Louise Rafkin writes, "there are those who are feeling curiously uncomfortable standing by as friends morph into men. Sometimes there is a generational flavor to this discomfort; many in the over-40 crowd feel particular unease", stating that this was "shaking the foundation of the lesbian-feminist world". Trans men were part of the protest at the 2000 Michigan Womyn's Music Festival, the first time the 'womyn-born womyn only' policy has been used against trans males, women supporting the transgender community and young gender-variant women.

In the early 1970s, conflicts began to emerge due to different syntheses of lesbian, feminist and transgender political movements, particularly in the United States. San Francisco trans activist and entertainer Beth Elliott became the focus of debate over whether to include transgender lesbians in the movement, and she was eventually blacklisted by her own movement.

Bisexual communities and binarism
One view is that the word bisexual is transphobic, as "bi" means "two" (thus implying a belief in the binary view of gender). Some people, such as scholar Shiri Eisner, say that some make the claim that the term "erases nonbinary genders and sexes out of existence", as many dictionaries define bisexuality as "of, relating to, or having a sexual orientation to persons of either sex", "sexually attracted to both men and women" and other similar definitions.

However, some bisexual individuals and scholars object to the notion that bisexuality means sexual attraction to only two genders, arguing that since bisexual is not simply about attraction to two sexes and encompasses gender as well, it can include attraction to more than one or more than two genders and is occasionally defined as such. Others, such as the American Institute of Bisexuality, say that the term "is an open and inclusive term for many kinds of people with same-sex and different-sex attractions" and that "the scientific classification bisexual only addresses the physical, biological sex of the people involved, not the gender-presentation."

To deal with issues related to transphobia and the gender binary, some individuals have taken on terms such as pansexual, omnisexual, or polysexual in place of the term bisexual. The American Institute of Bisexuality argues that these terms "describe a person with homosexual and heterosexual attractions, and therefore people with these labels are also bisexual" and that the notion that bisexuality is a reinforcement of a gender binary is a concept that is founded upon "anti-science, anti-Enlightenment philosophy that has ironically found a home within many Queer Studies departments at universities across the Anglophone world". Eisner agrees with this view, stating that "allegations of binarism have little to do with bisexuality's actual attributes or bisexual people's behavior in real life" and that the allegations are an attempt to separate the bisexual and transgender communities politically.

Consequences

Whether intentional or not, transphobia and cissexism have severe consequences for the target of the negative attitude. Transphobia creates significant stresses for transgender people which can lead them to feel shame, low self-esteem, alienation and inadequacy. Transgender youth often try to cope with the stress by running away from home, dropping out of school, using drugs or self-harming. Suicide rates among transgender people are thought to be especially high, because of how they are treated by their families and by society.

Childhood and adolescence
Polyvictimization is experiencing multiple forms of abuse and victimization throughout a person's life, such as physical or sexual violence, bullying/aggression, parental neglect or abuse, experiencing crime, etc. Polyvictimization can start in childhood and has consequences for adolescent health and thus adult health. 
Transgender, gender diverse, and sexual minority adolescents (TGSA) are more likely to experience polyvictimization when compared to their cisgender peers. Family traits more associated with polyvictimization in TGSA include: (1) families that have higher than average levels of violence and adversity in their life, (2) families that give their child higher than average levels of microagressions and lower levels of microaffirmations, and (3) families that have average levels of violence and adversity, and also give their child higher levels of microaffirmations. Posttraumatic stress disorder (PTSD) symptoms reported by TGSA has shown to be a significant link between TGSA grouped by their family experiences and polyvictimization.

Research supported by the National Institute of Mental Health (NIMH) assessed lesbian, gay, bisexual, and transgender (LGBT) adolescents and noted that those who had moderate to high, and steady or increasing rates of victimization or verbal or physical threats, were at heightened risk for developing PTSD. Relational and physical bullying victimization, as well as various other forms of emotional distress, are increasingly experienced by the transgender and gender diverse (TGD) adolescent population. Those who experience the most physical and relational bullying victimization and emotional distress, are AMAB youth whom others perceived as very, or mostly, feminine. Moreover, regardless of assigned gender at birth, relational bullying victimization, depression, and suicidal ideation is common among adolescents that can be perceived as anything other than very, or mostly, masculine.

Repeatedly, research on the effects of aggression and violence against TGD youth and young adults shows – when compared to their cisgender peers – higher rates of PTSD, depression, non-suicidal self-injury, suicidal ideation, intent, plan, and attempts, higher rates of substance use (cigarettes, alcohol, marijuana), trauma, skipping school due to safety concerns, and poorer health outcomes.

The 2015 United States Transgender Survey, the largest such survey ever carried out (with 27,715 respondents), found that one in ten respondents suffered transphobic violence at the hands of a family member and 8% were kicked out of their homes for being transgender. The majority of those who were openly transgender or perceived as transgender at school were victims of some form of mistreatment on account of this, including verbal abuse (54%), physical attacks (24%), and sexual assault (13%). 17% experienced such severe mistreatment that they had to leave school. Support from one's community or family was correlated with more positive outcomes related to mental health and social functioning.
62% of lawsuits involving transgender people state that defendants face family problems.

Adulthood
In adulthood, the effects of aggression and violence against various groups of transgender people has also been documented in domains such as mental and physical health, and safety and discrimination in the military. Transgender related bias, or discrimination, victimization, and rejection, affects transgender adults and the severity of PTSD symptoms they report. A systematic review completed in 2018 examined 77 studies that reported mental health disparities and social stress felt by TGD adults. The analysis found associations between TGD identity and anxiety, depression, PTSD, substance use, and suicidality, as well as added social stress factors such as violence, discrimination, and exclusion. When examining posttraumatic stress disorder and substance use in transgender adult communities, records indicated that transgender adults who have PTSD are more likely to be diagnosed with a substance use disorder within their lifetime. A National Institute of Health (NIH) analysis conducted with data collected at a community health center in the United States compared transgender and cisgender adult patients on various possible health disparities. Their research showed that within their lifetime, transgender patients experienced more violence, childhood abuse, discrimination, and suicidal thoughts or suicide attempts when compared to their cisgender counterparts who had a similar age, education, ethnicity/race, and income.

United States military
Strong associations between military sexual assault (MSA) and PTSD have been documented in both men and women. A nationwide survey of military personnel in 2015 found that 17.2% of transgender veterans reported experiencing MSA, and nearly two times more transgender men (30%) had a MSA experience when compared to transgender women (15.2%). Links have been found between MSA experienced by transgender veterans and increased depression symptom severity, drug use, and PTSD symptom severity.

Posttraumatic stress disorder has also been associated with suicidality and substance use among adults. For instance, records reflect that veterans who identify as transgender increasingly experience PTSD and suicide ideation, plans, and attempts. Further, transgender specific stigma experienced while in the military and PTSD have been associated with deaths by suicide.

This could be worsened by racial health disparities that exist within the United States Department of Veterans Affairs (VA) Healthcare System. Particularly, racial health disparities between non-Hispanic Black transgender veterans (BTV) and non-Hispanic White transgender veterans (WTV) have been acknowledged. Non-Hispanic Black transgender veterans are at increased odds of having an array of physical health issues/diseases, serious mental illnesses, alcohol use, tobacco use, homelessness, and previous incarceration when compared to the WTV. Non-Hispanic White transgender veterans had increased odds of depression, obesity, and hypercholesterolemia when compared to BTV. Previous incarceration plays a larger role in the PTSD and homelessness that transgender veterans may experience. Specifically, transgender veterans that have a history of previous incarceration are more likely to have PTSD or to experience homelessness when compared to previously incarcerated veterans who are not transgender.

Poverty and homelessness
Nearly one third of U.S. transgender people responding to the 2015 U.S. Transgender Survey lived in poverty, compared to 14% of the population. During the 12 months prior to the survey, 30% of employed transgender people were either fired or mistreated for being transgender, from verbal abuse to sexual violence. 30% had been homeless at some point in their life, and 12% had been homeless during the previous year. Family and community support were correlated with significantly lower rates of homelessness and poverty.

Violence and harassment
During the year prior to the 2015 U.S. survey, 46% of respondents had been verbally harassed and 9% had been physically attacked for being transgender. 10% had been sexually assaulted during the previous year, and 47% had been sexually assaulted at some point in their life.

Evidence collected by the Transgender Day of Remembrance and National Coalition of Anti-Violence Programs on the homicide rates of transgender individuals suggests that the homicide rates of young trans women who are Black or Latina are "almost certainly higher" than those of cisgender women of the same race.

In public restrooms
During the year prior to the 2015 U.S. survey, 12% of respondents reported being verbally harassed in a public restroom. 1% reported being sexually assaulted in a public restroom for being transgender, and 1% reported being otherwise physically assaulted for being transgender. 9% reported being denied the right to use a public restroom consistent with their gender.

Health
During the year prior to the 2015 U.S. survey, 59% of respondents reported avoiding using a public restroom out of fear of violence or harassment. 32% limited the amount they ate or drink in order to avoid using a public restroom. 8% reported suffering a urinary tract infection, kidney infection, or other kidney problem as a result of avoiding public restrooms.

33% reported having negative experiences with a healthcare professional related to being transgender, such as verbal harassment or denial of treatment. 23% reported that they did not seek treatment for a condition out of fear of being mistreated, while 33% did not seek treatment because they were unable to afford it.

During the month prior to the survey, 39% of American transgender people experienced major psychological distress, compared to 5% of the general population of the United States. 40% had attempted suicide at some point in their life, compared to 4.6 percent of the American population. Family and community support were correlated with far lower rates of suicide attempts and of major psychological distress.

A study conducted on transgender women of color in San Francisco has shown a higher correlation between transphobia and risk of transgender women engaging in HIV risk behavior. The study shows that the transgender youth face social discrimination, and they may not have a social role model. The young adults in this group have shown a higher risk of engaging in unprotected receptive anal intercourse when the exposure to transphobia is high. Therefore, as per the study shows a correlation between transphobia and high risk of HIV.

Mental health
People who are transgender are more likely to experience some type of psychological distress because of the harassment and discrimination that comes with transphobia. Student Affairs Administrators in Higher Education conducted a nationwide survey on college campuses examining the psychological effects on transgender people, with a sample size of 86. Out of these 86 participants, 54% stated they have attended psychological counseling before and 10% had been hospitalized for reasons related to mental health. The final results of the study show that over twice as many participants who considered themselves transgender (43%) had engaged in self-injurious behavior, versus those who considered themselves male or female (16%).

According to Virupaksha, Muralidhar, and Ramakrishna, suicide attempts among transgender people globally range from 32% to 50%. In India, 31% to 50% of transgender people have tried to commit suicide before age 20. 50% of transgender people in Australia and 45% of those in England have attempted suicide at least once. In the United States, suicide attempts reported by transgender and gender nonconforming adults exceed the rate of the general population: 41% versus 4.6 percent. In San Francisco alone, the suicide attempt rate among transgender people is 32% overall, and for those under age 25 it is 50%.

According to the study Transphobia Among Transgenders of Color by the University of California, San Francisco, transphobia affects the psychological vulnerability of transgender people of color as compared to those of other ethnicities. Acts of transphobia such as undue denial of services, unfair dismissal from work places or stigmatization have far-reaching effects on the subjects such as low self-esteem, under-performance, stress, withdrawal or even depression. When it comes to the minorities, who are already proven to be undergoing various forms of discrimination, the consequences are even more exaggerated. Transgender people of color are more significantly associated with depression than their white counterparts.

Information regarding the effects of transphobia with respect to minority identities has not been well documented. In a 2018 review of mental health research regarding transgender individuals, only 4 out of 77 studies that were reviewed examined the intersectionality of transgender and racial identities. There were other studies that included disproportionately high amounts of transgender individuals who are in multiple minority groups, but the authors note that it is difficult to tell if these studies generalize to the transgender/ gender nonconforming community as a whole due to lack of extensive study.

To help transgender people work through traumatic experiences, minority stress, and internalized transphobia, mental health practitioners have begun integrating the gender-affirmative model into cognitive behavioral therapy, person-centered therapy, and acceptance and commitment therapy.

Pregnancy issues

Many transgender people transition without undergoing surgery to remove reproductive organs or to reconstruct genitals, thus transition does not necessarily remove the ability or the desire to reproduce. While the same-sex issues surrounding the birth and parenting of children have gained a degree of acceptance, trans practices of parenting have received much less attention and acceptance. In 2007 a transgender man, Thomas Beatie, became pregnant because his wife was infertile. His pregnancy drew world-wide attention. He commented: 

Doctors have discriminated against us, turning us away due to their religious beliefs. Health care professionals have refused to call me by a male pronoun or recognize Nancy as my wife. Receptionists have laughed at us. Friends and family have been unsupportive; most of Nancy's family doesn't even know I'm transgender.

See also

 GATE
 Hate crime
 Biological determinism
 Corrective rape
 LGBT people in prison
 List of transgender-related topics
 List of people killed for being transgender
 Minority stress
 Press for Change – UK law organisation for transgender people
 Transgender Day of Remembrance
 Transgender Europe
 Transgender inequality
 Transgender Law Center
 Transmisogyny
 Trans panic defense – a legal defense for assault or murder where the victim is trans.
 Transphobia in the United States
 Yogyakarta Principles

References

Further reading
 "Thematic report on Discrimination against trans and intersex people on the grounds of sex, gender identity and gender expression", The European Commission, 2012.

External links

 
 Survivor bashing – bias motivated hate crimes
 Translatina documentary (2010)

 
Anti-LGBT sentiment
Sexism
Phobias
Prejudice and discrimination by type